The Catch Trap is a novel by Marion Zimmer Bradley, published in 1979. Set in the circus world of the 1940s and 1950s, it tells the story of two trapeze artists, Mario Santelli and Tommy Zane, and the professional relationship they develop which ultimately leads to love.

This rich tale encompasses the exhilarating highs of soaring under the Big Top down to the lows of having to hide their secret relationship from their extended colourful circus family due to the conservative times they live in. What does remain steadfast is their devotion and passion to both their craft and each other.

References

1979 American novels
Novels set in the 20th century
Circus books
Random House books
Novels by Marion Zimmer Bradley